Jorge Hernán Menosse Acosta (born 28 April 1987) is a Uruguayan footballer who plays as a central defender for Club Atlético Peñarol.

Club career
Born in San Carlos, Menosse played youth football with local CA Libertad de San Carlos, making his senior debuts in 2007–08 season. In 2009, he joined Primera División side CA Atenas de San Carlos, but his side was relegated to Segunda División at the end of the campaign nonetheless.

In January 2012 Menosse returned to the top division, after agreeing to a deal with Montevideo Wanderers FC. He appeared regularly, scoring his first goal for the club on 28 April 2013, in a 2–0 away win against CA Bella Vista.

On 2 July 2013 Menosse signed a one-year loan deal with Recreativo de Huelva, in Spanish Segunda División. On 14 September he played his first game abroad, starting in a 3–0 away win over CD Mirandés.

Menosse scored his first goal for Recre on 16 November 2013, in a 3–3 draw at Deportivo Alavés. After appearing regularly during the campaign, his loan was renewed for a further year the following 23 June.

Menosse left the club after their relegation in 2015, and subsequently represented Once Caldas and Rosario Central before returning to Spain on 5 July 2017, after agreeing to a two-year contract with Granada CF. After appearing sparingly, he moved to Belgrano roughly one year later.

On 28 January 2019, Menosse signed a six-month contract with CD Lugo.

References

External links

1987 births
Living people
People from San Carlos, Uruguay
Uruguayan people of French descent
Uruguayan footballers
Association football defenders
Uruguayan Primera División players
Categoría Primera A players
Segunda División players
Argentine Primera División players
Atenas de San Carlos players
Montevideo Wanderers F.C. players
Recreativo de Huelva players
Granada CF footballers
CD Lugo players
Defensor Sporting players
Once Caldas footballers
Rosario Central footballers
Club Atlético Belgrano footballers
Deportivo Cali footballers
Uruguayan expatriate footballers
Uruguayan expatriate sportspeople in Spain
Uruguayan expatriate sportspeople in Colombia
Uruguayan expatriate sportspeople in Argentina
Expatriate footballers in Spain
Expatriate footballers in Colombia
Expatriate footballers in Argentina